Gerald Dean Glasco Jr. (born October 29, 1958) is an American college softball coach who is currently head coach at Louisiana and the Women's Professional Fastpitch team Smash It Sports Vipers. Previously, Glasco had been a high school softball coach, an assistant at Georgia and Texas A&M, and National Pro Fastpitch head coach with the USSSA Pride and Scrap Yard Dawgs.

Early life and education 
Glasco was born in 1958 in Macomb, Illinois. He attended high school at Crab Orchard High School where he lettered in baseball and basketball. He attended college at the University of Illinois Urbana-Champaign and earned a bachelor's degree in Agricultural Economics.

Coaching career

High school and travel ball (2000–2008)
From 2000 to 2004 and 2007 to 2008 at Johnston City High School in Johnston City, Illinois, Glasco was varsity assistant softball coach; he was also junior varsity head coach in 2008. During his time there, Glasco created  the Illinois Southern Force 18U ASA team, for which he served as the head coach from 2002 to 2008. His team finished in the Top 20 four times at the ASA Gold Nationals and won the championship in 2004. That year, Glasco and his coaching staff were named the National Coaching Staff of the Year for travel softball teams by the NFCA.

College assistant (2009–2017)
Glasco started his collegiate career in softball at Georgia as assistant head coach and recruiting coordinator from 2009 to 2011. During his time at Georgia, he brought his team to a 282–92 cumulative record, topping NCAA and SEC rankings in almost all offensive categories and setting over 20 team records. In 2012, Glasco was promoted to associate head coach, a position that he held until 2014.

In 2014, Glasco joined Texas A&M as associate head coach. In the 2016 and 2017 seasons, the Aggies led the SEC in home run in regular season conference play. In 2017, the Aggies had their best SEC Conference finish ever with a 16–7 conference record and advanced to the Women's College World Series.

Louisiana (2018–present)
After firing former head coach Michael Lotief for alleged abusive conduct, the University of Louisiana at Lafayette hired Glasco as head coach for the Louisiana Ragin' Cajuns softball team on November 20, 2017. At the time of his hire, Glasco had been associate head coach at Auburn. In his first season as head coach, Glasco led Louisiana to a 41–16 record, including a 3–2 record in the NCAA Tournament that had both a 5–4 upset win and loss in the regional final to host LSU. The 2019 season ended in similar heartbreak after Louisiana defeated Southeast Missouri State and Ole Miss in the Oxford Regional to lose to Ole Miss 1–5 and force a game 7. In the game 7, the Cajuns would rally back from a 0–3 deficit to be 4–3, then eventually lose when Ole Miss would score 2 in the 7th inning.  Following a shortened 2020 COVID-19 season, the Cajuns would repeat back-to-back as both conference regular season and tournament champions with appearances in the 2021 Baton Rouge Regionals and the 2022 Clemson Regionals.

Professional
Glasco has been a head coach with National Pro Fastpitch (NPF) three times, first for USSSA Pride in 2014 then the Scrap Yard Dawgs in 2017, and again for USSSA Pride in 2019. All three teams won the NPF's Cowles Cup championship. Glasco also currently serves as the head coach for the Smash It Sports Vipers, a team in the Women's Professional Fastpitch league, an offspring of the NPF.

Head coaching record
The following table shows Glasco's record as a college head coach.

Personal life
Glasco is married to Vickie Glasco and has three daughters, all of whom have been involved in softball, including Tara Glasco Archibald who is Head Coach at Eastern Illinois University in Charleston, Illinois since August 2019, and was formerly the assistant coach at Illinois State 2017-2019. His daughter Erin Glasco Simons played softball at Texas A&M University.

In 2019, Glasco's daughter Geri Ann Glasco, who had just been hired as a Volunteer Assistant Coach at Louisiana, was killed in a car accident in Lafayette, Louisiana.

References

1958 births
Living people
American softball coaches
Softball coaches from Illinois
Louisiana Ragin' Cajuns softball coaches
Texas A&M Aggies softball coaches
Georgia Bulldogs softball coaches
University of Illinois College of Agriculture, Consumer, and Environmental Sciences alumni
People from Williamson County, Illinois